Wirswall is a civil parish in Cheshire East, England.  It contains five buildings that are recorded in the National Heritage List for England as designated listed buildings, all of which are listed at Grade II.  This grade is the lowest of the three gradings given to listed buildings and is applied to "buildings of national importance and special interest".  Apart from the village of Wirswall, the parish is rural.  The Llangollen Canal passes through the parish, and two locks within the parish are listed.  The other listed buildings are two farmhouses and a barn.

References

Citations

Sources

 

Listed buildings in the Borough of Cheshire East
Lists of listed buildings in Cheshire